Zakaria Bahous (born May 8, 2001) is a Canadian soccer player who plays as a midfielder for Canadian Premier League club Atlético Ottawa.

Early life and college career
Bahous played youth soccer with FC Brossard, FC St-Léonard, and CS Longueuil.

Bahous began attending Champlain College Saint-Lambert in 2018, playing for the men's soccer team, serving as team captain by the end of his four-year career. In 2021, he led the RSEQ with ten goals in nine games, earning Canadian Collegiate Athletic Association Player of the Year honours, and being named an RSEQ D1 All-Star.

Club career
He began his senior career with CS Longueuil in the Première ligue de soccer du Québec.

In 2021, he played for FC Laval in the PLSQ.

In 2022, he signed a professional contract with Canadian Premier League club Atlético Ottawa for two years, with a club option for 2024. He made his debut on April 9, against Cavalry FC. On October 1st, Bahous scored his first professional goal, scoring the winning goal in a 2-1 victory over HFX Wanderers FC.

Personal
Bahous is of Algerian descent.

Honours

Atlético Ottawa 
 Canadian Premier League
Regular Season: 2022

Career statistics

References

External links

2001 births
Living people
Association football midfielders
Canadian soccer players
Première ligue de soccer du Québec players
Canadian Premier League players
FC Brossard players
FC St-Léonard players
CS Longueuil players
FC Laval players
Atlético Ottawa players
Canadian people of Algerian descent